The Jefferson Davis County School District is a public school district based in Prentiss, Mississippi (USA). The district's boundaries parallel that of Jefferson Davis County.

Schools

High school
 Jefferson Davis County High School. Started in the 2017–18 school year, it now serves as the only high school in the county after the school closings of Prentiss High School and Bassfield High School at the end of the 2016–17 school year. It operates out of the former Bassfield High School.

Jr. High School
 Jefferson Davis County Jr. High School. Started in the 2017–18 school year, it now serves as the only junior high school after the school closings of Prentiss High School and Bassfield High School at the end of the 2016–17 school year. It operates out of the former Prentiss High School.

Elementary schools
G.W. Carver Elementary School (Bassfield, MS)
J.E. Johnson Elementary School (Prentiss, MS)

Demographics

2006-07 school year
There were a total of 2,035 students enrolled in the Jefferson Davis County School District during the 2006–2007 school year. The gender makeup of the district was 48% female and 52% male. The racial makeup of the district was 88.65% African American, 11.06% White, 0.15% Hispanic, and 0.15% Asian. 99.9% of the district's students were eligible to receive free lunch.

Previous school years

Accountability statistics

See also
List of school districts in Mississippi

References

External links
 

Education in Jefferson Davis County, Mississippi
School districts in Mississippi